Cussonia paniculata, also known as kiepersol, is a large evergreen shrub or small tree up to  in height native to South Africa. The plant has large and bold textured grey foliage.

Uses
The leaf is used ethnomedically to treat dysmenorrhea.

Cultivation

Cussonia paniculata is cultivated as an ornamental plant for planting in temperate climate gardens and in container gardens.

References
PlantZAfrica.com: Cussonia paniculata

External links

 PlantZAfrica.com 
 iSpot Images of Cussonia paniculata subsp. paniculata
 iSpot Images of Cussonia paniculata subsp. sinuata
 

Araliaceae
Flora of South Africa
Trees of South Africa
Garden plants of Southern Africa
Drought-tolerant plants
Ornamental trees